Bristol Congregational Church, also known as the Chapel on the Green, is a historic church located at 107 W. Center Street in Yorkville, Illinois. The Congregational church was built in 1855 for a congregation which formed in the 1830s. The church's design came from a pattern book and includes elements of both the Greek Revival and Carpenter Gothic styles. The church's structure, which includes a bell tower, pediment, and symmetrical windows, is typical of Greek Revival churches. Its Carpenter Gothic elements are mainly decorative and include ornamental wooden trim and a finial. The church is the only remaining 19th-century church in Yorkville and its oldest non-residential building of any sort.

The church was added to the National Register of Historic Places on September 6, 2016.

References

External links

Chapel on the Green Historical Society

Churches on the National Register of Historic Places in Illinois
National Register of Historic Places in Kendall County, Illinois
Yorkville, Illinois
Greek Revival architecture in Illinois
Gothic Revival architecture in Illinois
Churches completed in 1855